Edward Willett Wagner (August 7, 1924 – December 7, 2001) was an American academic and a professor of Korean studies at Harvard University; he was an expert on Korean aristocracy during the Choson dynasty period.

Early life and education
Wagner was born in Cleveland, Ohio to Theodore and Gertrude Wagner; Wagner had an older brother Ted, a twin brother Walter, a younger brother John, and a younger sister Rachel.

Wagner graduated in 1941 at the age of 16 from Canton McKinley High School in Canton, Ohio.  He enrolled at Harvard University on scholarship that fall.  His undergraduate career was interrupted by World War II. Wagner briefly served in the U.S. Army during the war. His interest in Korean studies arose while working as a civilian in Korea as part of the transitional U.S. military government there between 1945 and 1948.  After resuming his undergraduate work at Harvard in 1948, he received his bachelor's degree and master's degree from Harvard and his PhD from there in 1959.

Career
After earning his PhD from Harvard in 1959, Wagner then joined Harvard's faculty, from which he retired in 1993. He founded the Korea Institute at Harvard University in 1981 and served as its director until 1993.

Later life and death
Wagner died on December 7, 2001, at Concord, Massachusetts from Alzheimer's disease.

Personal life
Wagner lived in Lexington, Massachusetts and was married to Leonore Uhlmann from 1948 to 1966, when the couple divorced. In 1968 he married Namhi Kim, who was his wife at the time of his death.

Legacy
Due to his influence in the field, Wagner is often referred to as the "Father of [American] Korean Studies".

Works
 The Korean Minority in Japan, 1904-1950 (1951)
 The Literati Purges: Political Conflict in Early Yi Korea (1974–1975)
 A New History of Korea (English translation)

References

Further reading
 Martina Deuchler, In Memory of Edward Willett Wagner, Acta Koreana, Vol. 5, No. 2, July 2002 (ISSN 1520-7412)
James B. Palais, Edward W. Wagner (1924-2001), The Journal of Asian Studies, Vol. 61, No. 3 (Aug., 2002), pp. 1137-1139,

External links
Edward Willett Wagner. Faculty of Arts and Sciences - Memorial Minute, The Harvard University Gazette,  March 22, 2007
"Edward Wagner", HISTORY OF THE DEPARTMENT / 1950-1960; East Asian Languages and Civilizations, Harvard University

1924 births
2001 deaths
Deaths from Alzheimer's disease
Neurological disease deaths in Massachusetts
Harvard University alumni
Harvard University faculty
20th-century American historians
American male non-fiction writers
Historians of Korea
United States Army soldiers
American expatriates in South Korea
20th-century American male writers